Hurricane King was the most severe hurricane to strike the city of Miami, Florida since the 1926 Miami hurricane. It was the eleventh tropical storm and the last of six major hurricanes in the 1950 Atlantic hurricane season. The cyclone formed in the western Caribbean Sea on October 13, and initially moved northeastward, slowly strengthening. Hurricane King crossed Cuba on October 17, causing seven deaths and $2 million in damage (1950 USD). The hurricane damaged 20,861 houses in southern Florida, 580 of them severely, and destroyed a further 248. Further inland, King caused heavy crop damage, particularly to the citrus industry. After weakening to a tropical storm, King moved across Georgia, where it caused isolated power outages and minor damage. Across the United States, the hurricane left four fatalities and $30 million in damage ($316 million in 2014 USD).

Meteorological history

The origins of Hurricane King were from a tropical depression that developed just off the north coast of Honduras on October 13. It was a small system throughout its duration, and initially moved toward the east and east-northeast. At the time, the system was considered a weak and broad depression, producing convection, or thunderstorms, from Honduras to western Cuba. It tracked to the east-northeast, becoming a tropical storm on October 14. The system was later given the name "King" from the Joint Army/Navy Phonetic Alphabet.

The tropical storm slowly intensified as it tracked toward Cuba, and on October 16, King attained hurricane status while passing between Jamaica and the Cayman Islands. The hurricane remained small, as the city of Camagüey reported peak winds of only . Within twelve hours, Hurricane King crossed central Cuba, during which it weakened into a minimal hurricane. The hurricane quickly intensified as it turned north-northwestward. Early on October 18, King attained major hurricane status; it was the sixth and final major hurricane of the season.

Over land, the compact hurricane weakened as it continued through the state. After crossing Lake Okeechobee, Hurricane King passed over the city of Okeechobee, which recorded a pressure of 977 mbar. The winds diminished along the southern and western side of the storm, although winds gusted to hurricane force in many locations in eastern coastal Florida. Early on October 19, King weakened to tropical storm status over north-central Florida, and later that day weakened further into a tropical depression over western Georgia. King curved northwestward, dissipating over Alabama on October 20.

Preparations and impact

Caribbean
Early in its duration, King produced a widespread area of convection that spread from Honduras to Cuba. Swan Island, located just off of the coast of Honduras, reported  of rainfall. Prior to its first landfall, officials posted hurricane warnings across eastern Cuba and the Bahamas. The hurricane killed seven people and caused $2 million (1950 USD) in damage throughout the country. Offshore, a freighter sunk during the storm, prompting the crew's rescue by the Cuban navy. There was an initial report of ten people missing on the ship, although it is unknown how many, if any, were related to the seven confirmed deaths in the country.

Florida
About 36 hours prior to the hurricane making landfall, when it was still south of Cuba, the Miami Weather Bureau issued a hurricane alert for South Florida. About 18 hours before landfall, the alert was replaced by a hurricane warning. The advance warning time was believed to have prevented many deaths; however, the population was considered complacent with the warning, causing additional damage when they executed improper preparations, such as securing windows.

Hurricane King struck Miami around midnight local time with a very compact area of strong winds. The principal damage zone was sharply-defined in an area  in diameter; the boundaries of the damage resembled the path of a tornado, although a subsequent analysis indicated the majority of the damage was not tornadic in nature. There was one confirmed report of a damaging tornado in Davie. As it made landfall, Hurricane King produced lightning near its center, which was the first confirmed occurrence in Florida. The Weather Bureau considered King the severest hurricane since the 1926 Great Miami Hurricane to hit the area.

Across Florida, damage totaled $27.75 million (1950 USD), of which $15 million was in the Miami metropolitan area. The hurricane damaged 20,861 houses in southern Florida, 580 of them severely. Additionally, 248 trailer homes were damaged, 188 of them severely. A total of 248 houses or trailers were destroyed in the Miami area. A preliminary survey indicated there were about 2,000 store windows that were broken during the storm. In West Hollywood, a town of 2,000 people located north of Miami, strong winds destroyed or severely damaged about 150 houses, leaving hundreds homeless. At the Broward County airport in Fort Lauderdale, the winds damaged 55 buildings and destroyed one plane. Further north, damage was lighter in Palm Beach, consisting of downed trees and flooded streets. Along its path through the state, strong winds were observed around Lake Okeechobee, with a  gust in Clewiston. In Orlando, the winds destroyed the roof of an airport hangar.

In central Florida, the hurricane caused widespread damage to crops and properties. Damage to the grapefruit crop was heaviest in the region along the Indian River, where losses were expected to reach 30%. The orange crop was not as affected, and no area reported total losses at more than 5%. Losses to the citrus crop were considered better than initially anticipated. Overall, the citrus crop damage totaled about $3 million, with 2.5 million boxes destroyed. Near Pompano, high winds and rain caused heavy losses to crops planted during early autumn, including snap beans, lima beans, cucumbers, eggplant, pepper, and squash; most of the crops required replanting. Elsewhere, the snap bean and sweet corn crops were severely damaged around the Everglades, and farms around Fort Pierce experienced heavy losses to the tomato crop.

In Jacksonville, Hurricane King left widespread power outages due to the winds knocking over trees and power lines. Street flooding was reported, and around 30 families required evacuation due to the storm.

Overall, there were 50 injuries in the state, as well as at least three deaths. Two of them – a woman in West Hollywood, Florida and a man in Hallandale – were killed when their houses collapsed from the strong winds. The third death occurred in Sanford when a boy drowned in a flooded stream. There were also unconfirmed reports of a fourth person drowning when his boat capsized west of Bunnell. The hurricane was one of two major hurricanes – a Category 3 or higher on the Saffir-Simpson scale – to hit the state in 1950. It was the first time on record that two storms of such intensity hit Florida in the same year, and has only been repeated since in 2004 with hurricanes Charley and Jeanne, and in 2005 with hurricanes Dennis and Wilma.

Elsewhere in the United States
Later in its duration, King moved into Georgia as a weakening tropical storm before dissipating. Across the state, King produced $250,000 in damage (1950 USD) and caused one death.

Throughout the United States, Hurricane King caused 4 deaths and $30 million in damage (1950 USD). The hurricane also caused 199 injuries, of which 16 were severe.

Aftermath
After the hurricane's passage, officials deployed the Florida National Guard to affected areas in order to maintain order and quell looting. Across Florida, a total of 3,897 people filed damage claims after receiving damage from the hurricane, 80% of them in the Miami area. Insurance companies paid about $1 million to compensate for the storm damage. Due to the loss in citrus crop, prices briefly increased, although they returned to normal levels by late October.

The name King was not used again after the season, although it was on the naming list for 1951 and 1952 due to being part of the Joint Army/Navy Phonetic Alphabet. The Phonetic Alphabet was decommissioned in 1953 in favor of using female names. Based on population growth in south Florida, it is estimated that a storm identical to Hurricane King would cause $2.8 billion in insured damage if it struck in 2001, with the total roughly split between Broward and Miami-Dade counties.

See also

 Hurricane Andrew
 Hurricane Charley
 Hurricane Irma took a similar track up the Florida peninsula.
 Hurricane Michael
 Hurricane Wilma
 List of Category 4 Atlantic hurricanes
 List of Cuba hurricanes
 List of Florida hurricanes (1950-1974)

References

1950 Atlantic hurricane season
Hurricanes in Cuba
Hurricanes in Florida
Category 4 Atlantic hurricanes
1950 natural disasters in the United States